Acinetobacter boissieri is a gram-negative, oxidase-negative, catalase-positive, strictly aerobic nonmotile bacterium from the genus Acinetobacter which was isolated from plants' floral nectar pollinated by wild Mediterranean insects. Acinetobacter boissieri is named after botanist Pierre Edmond Boissier.

References

External links
Type strain of Acinetobacter boissieri at BacDive -  the Bacterial Diversity Metadatabase

Moraxellaceae
Bacteria described in 2013